David "Dave" Seville is a fictional character, the producer and manager of the fictional singing group Alvin and the Chipmunks. The character was created by Ross Bagdasarian Sr., who had used the name "David Seville" as his stage name prior to the creation of the Chipmunks, while writing and recording novelty records in the 1950s. One of the records, recorded in 1958 under the David Seville stage name, was "Witch Doctor", featuring a sped-up high-pitched vocal technique. Bagdasarian would later use that technique in "The Chipmunk Song (Christmas Don't Be Late)", which would introduce both Alvin and the Chipmunks as a singing group and Bagdasarian's music producer "Dave". Bagdasarian would go on to create The Alvin Show, based on the Alvin and the Chipmunks group, where he voiced the semi-fictional character David Seville, based largely on himself, with Alvin based on Ross's sometimes rebellious son Adam.

Bagdasarian Sr. died in 1972, and his son (Adam's brother) Ross Bagdasarian Jr. took over ownership of Bagdasarian Productions. He reprised the David Seville character, first in a series of novelty albums beginning with 1980's Chipmunk Punk. Bagdasarian Jr. subsequently assumed the role on the TV series Alvin and the Chipmunks, which ran in original episodes from 1983–1990. Bagdasarian Jr. has voiced David Seville in all official animated and recorded incarnations of David Seville since taking over for his father in the 1970s, including TV series, animated specials, and direct-to-video productions. He most recently voiced the character in the 2015 reboot of the Alvin and the Chipmunks television show.

Actor Jason Lee also portrays David Seville in live action/CGI films starring Alvin and the Chipmunks, which use a combination of live-action acting and computer animation. While Ross Bagdasarian Jr. does not do any voices for the film series, the films are all produced in association with Bagdasarian Productions, which owns the rights to all of the characters.

Portrayed by

Filmography

Films

Television

See also

References

Fictional characters introduced in 1958
Alter egos
Alvin and the Chipmunks
Fictional managers
Fictional producers
American male characters in television